West Sussex is in south-east England and it has a population of approximately 780,000. The county town is Chichester. In the north of the county are the heavy clays and sands of the Weald. The chalk of the South Downs runs across the centre from east to west and in the south a coastal plain runs down to the English Channel.

In England, Sites of Special Scientific Interest (SSSIs) are designated by Natural England, which is responsible for protecting England's natural environment. The most important wildlife and geological sites are designated as SSSIs in order to give them legal protection.

As of July 2019 there are 77 SSSIs in West Sussex, of which 53 are biological, 18 are geological and 6 are both biological and geological. Twenty-four are Geological Conservation Review sites, fifteen are Nature Conservation Review sites, ten are Special Areas of Conservation, six are Special Protection Areas, five are internationally important Ramsar wetland sites, two are national nature reserves, seven are local nature reserves, parts of six are scheduled monuments, ten are managed by the Sussex Wildlife Trust and one, which is partly in Surrey, is managed by the Surrey Wildlife Trust.

Key

Interest
B = site of biological interest
G = site of geological interest

Public access
FP = access to footpaths through the site only
No = no public access to site
PP = public access to part of site
Yes = public access to all or most of the site

Other classifications
GCR = Geological Conservation Review site
LNR = Local nature reserve
NCR = Nature Conservation Review site
NNR = National nature reserve
Ramsar = Ramsar site, an internationally important wetland site
SAC = Special Area of Conservation
SM = Scheduled monument
SPA = Special Protection Area under the European Union Directive on the Conservation of Wild Birds
SWT = Sussex Wildlife Trust
SYWT = Surrey Wildlife Trust

Sites

See also
List of Local Nature Reserves in West Sussex
Sussex Wildlife Trust

Notes

References

Sources

 
West Sussex
West Sussex-related lists